Fuli Township is a rural township located in southern Hualien County, Taiwan.

Geography

The township is located at the Huatung Valley. It has 9,681 inhabitants with 4,033 households around. The population is composed of Hakka, Hoklo, and Ami peoples.

Administrative divisions
Fengnan, Fuli, Funan, Luoshan, Mingli, Shipai, Tungli, Wanning, Wujiang, Xinxing, Xuetian Yongfeng and Zhutian Village.

Economy
The agricultural product of Fuli Rice is a famous rice in Taiwan and provides a well economy development and working chances for residents.

Tourist attractions

 Dongli Story House
 Xiuguluan River
 Fuli Hot spring
 Loshan Waterfall
 Luntian Recreation Area
 Luoshan Recreation Area
 Shihcuo Ditch
 Siou Tianhsiang
 Sixty Stones Mountain - Golden Needle Flower (Hemerocallis fulva) Recreation Area

Transportation

Rail
 Dongli Station
 Dongzhu Station
 Fuli Station

Notable natives
 Waa Wei, singer, songwriter, radio DJ, author, actress, artist

References

External links
  Office of Fuli Township (Chinese)

Townships in Hualien County